John Earle Reynolds Raven (23 April 1851 – 3 April 1940) was an English cricketer.  Raven was a right-handed batsman who bowled right-arm fast-medium.  He was born at Broughton Astley, Leicestershire.

Raven made a single first-class appearance for Sussex against Surrey at The Oval in 1874.  In this match, he bowled 18 wicketless overs in Surrey's first-innings as they compiled 348 all out, while in Sussex's first-innings he batted at number eleven and was dismissed for 10 runs by James Southerton, with Sussex being dismissed for 147.  Sussex were forced to follow-on, with Raven scoring 4 runs before being dismissed by James Street, with Sussex being dismissed for 199.  Surrey won the match by an innings and 2 runs.  This was his only major appearance for Sussex.

He died at Nutfield, Surrey on 3 April 1940.

References

External links
John Raven at ESPNcricinfo
John Raven at CricketArchive

1851 births
1940 deaths
People from Broughton Astley
Cricketers from Leicestershire
People educated at Lancing College
English cricketers
Sussex cricketers